Edford Township is one of twenty-four townships in Henry County, Illinois, USA.  As of the 2010 census, its population was 667 and it contained 284 housing units.

Geography

Unincorporated towns
 Green River at 
(This list is based on USGS data and may include former settlements.)

Adjacent townships
 Hanna Township (north)
 Geneseo Township (east)
 Osco Township (south)
 Western Township (southwest)
 Colona Township (west)

Cemeteries
The township contains Edford Cemetery.

Major highways
  Interstate 80
  U.S. Route 6

Landmarks
 Hennepin Canal Parkway State Park (west quarter)

Demographics

School districts
 Geneseo Community Unit School District 228

Political districts
 Illinois's 14th congressional district
 State House District 71
 State Senate District 36

References
 
 United States Census Bureau 2008 TIGER/Line Shapefiles
 United States National Atlas

External links
 City-Data.com
 Illinois State Archives
 Township Officials of Illinois

Townships in Henry County, Illinois
Townships in Illinois